Metaris Valley is a small, rounded cirque valley with steep sides and residual névé, lying west of Derrick Peak in the Britannia Range in Antarctica. It was named in association with Britannia by a University of Waikato geological party, 1978–79, led by Michael Selby. "Metaris" is the historical name of a bay in Roman Britain, known today as The Wash.

References

Valleys of Oates Land